Sharrina Abdullah is a Malaysian diplomat who is Ambassador to Switzerland and was Ambassador to Senegal.  She presented her credentials in Senegal on February 17, 2014.

References

Ambassadors of Malaysia to Switzerland
Ambassadors to Senegal
Malaysian women ambassadors
Year of birth missing (living people)
Living people